Boguoduo（Chinese: , Manchu: ᠪᠣᡤᠣᡩᠠ; Abkai: Boggoda；1650-1723) was a member of Manchu Aisin Gioro clan, a grandson of Hong Taiji, the eldest son of the Prince Chengzeyu Shuose and a paternal cousin of the Kangxi Emperor.

Life 
Boguoduo was born in 1650 to Shuose's primary consort, lady Nara. In 1655, he inherited the Prince Chengze peerage after his father's death under the name "Prince Zhuang of the First Rank" .

His second daughter, Daokexin, was raised in the imperial palace and granted a title of the Princess of the Third Rank. According to the tradition, a daughter of the imperial prince adopted into imperial household could receive a title of imperial princess (gongzhu). This honour was bestowed upon  his adopted granddaughter, later known as Princess Duanrou of the Second Rank.

Boguoduo died in 1723 and was posthumously honoured as Prince Zhuangjing of the First Rank（庄靖亲王, "zhuangjing" meaning "dignified and quiet"). He was succeeded by Yongzheng Emperor's half-brother, Yunlu, due to lack of a mail heir.

Family 

 Primary consort, of the Chahar Borjigin clan，daughter of Abunai；
 Mistress of the Shi clan (庶福晋石氏)，daughter of Shi Gui (石贵)；
 Mistress, of the Zhang clan (庶福晋张氏)，daughter of Zhang Wendi (张文第)；
 Mistress, of the Zhou clan (庶福晋周氏)，daughter of Zhou Da (周达).

Issue 

 Adopted son: Prince Zhuangke of the First Rank (和硕庄恪亲王) Yunlu (允禄).
 First daughter
 Married Namuzha of the Barin league

 Princess Daokexin of the Third Rank (道克欣郡主), second daughter by lady Borjigit 
 Married Abao, of the Alxa Borjigin clan before 1740 and had issue (three sons : Gumubuzao, Labucang Dorji and Larjiwang).

References 

Qing dynasty imperial princes
Prince Zhuang